The iPad 10.2-inch (officially iPad (9th generation), also referred as iPad 9) is a tablet computer developed and marketed by Apple Inc. as the successor to the eighth-generation iPad. It was announced on September 14, 2021.

Features 

The ninth-generation iPad has the same design as the seventh- and eighth-generation iPads, although all color options now come with a black screen bezel, and the gold option has been removed. It is compatible with the Apple Pencil (1st generation), and the Smart Keyboard and Smart Connector for keyboard attachments. It uses the Apple A13 Bionic chip, which Apple claims gives a 20% CPU, GPU, and Neural Engine increase in performance compared to its predecessor. It features a 10.2-inch retina display identical to the previous models, with 1620 by 2160 pixels at a density of 264 PPI, and includes True Tone technology, meaning the display can adjust its color temperature based on the surrounding lighting temperature. A new 12 MP front camera is fitted in place of the 1.2 MP camera of previous models, which features Center Stage technology that detects the user and moves the camera view accordingly during video recording and calls. The rear 8 MP camera is from the earlier iPad Air 2. The base storage is doubled to 64 GB. iPadOS 15 is pre-installed at release.

Reception 
The New York Times called the 9th-generation iPad "the best tablet for almost anyone" in 2022, praising its price, performance and features.

Timeline

Notes

References 

9
IOS
Tablet computers
Touchscreen portable media players
Tablet computers introduced in 2021